Phil Potvin (born November 7, 1946) is a member of the Michigan House of Representatives, first elected in 2010 and re-elected to a second term in 2012. His district consists of Wexford, Mecosta, and western Osceola Counties.

Potvin was the chief executive officer of Western Concrete Products Company, and board chairman and executive committee member of the National Concrete Masonry Association. He also served as a second lieutenant in the Michigan National Guard. An Eagle Scout, he is very involved in the Boy Scouts of America, serving on the executive board member of the Scenic Trails Boy Scout Council and as assistant scoutmaster for Boy Scout Troop 125 in Cadillac. Potvin is also a member of Ducks Unlimited, the National Rifle Association, the Michigan Farm Bureau, and Right to Life of Michigan.

In 1996, Potvin was cited by Michigan's Department of Environmental Quality (DEQ) for the illegal dumping of several hundred gallons of toxic materials into an old elevator pit by Cadillac's branch of Western Concrete Products Company. The clean-up effort ranged from 1998 until its termination in 2002 and cost the company $162,500 in fines. [2]

References
2. Potvin's Illegal Dump

1946 births
Living people
Republican Party members of the Michigan House of Representatives
People from Alpena, Michigan
People from Cadillac, Michigan
Albion College alumni
Central Michigan University alumni
21st-century American politicians